Anisopappus pseudopinnatifidus is a species of flowering plant in the family Asteraceae. It is found only in Namibia. Its natural habitat is subtropical or tropical dry shrubland. Although the plant is listed on the IUCN Red List of Threatened Species, its population numbers are considered to be stable.

References

pseudopinnatifidus
Flora of Namibia
Least concern plants
Taxonomy articles created by Polbot